Fool's Paradise is a chamber opera for children in one act composed by Ofer Ben-Amots with a libretto by the composer based on the short story of the same name by Isaac Bashevis Singer. The opera premiered at the Odeon theatre in Vienna in November 1994.

Roles

Synopsis

Scene 1
The scene opens with Atzel appearing as a child at bedtime. He begs Nanny to tell him his favorite story-the story of Paradise. Nanny describes a place where nobody works or strains and everybody enjoys luxuries usually reserved for the righteous. Atzel drifts to sleep, barely heeding her warning that only the dead can reach Paradise.

Scene 2

Atzel, now eighteen years old, and his father Kadish are laboring. Atzel, who is due to marry the beautiful Aksah, is starting to feel resentment towards the hard work inherent in the adult life that lies before him. He reminisces about childhood and dreams of Paradise. He realizes Paradise could be the solution to his problems. Imagining that he has died, he announces to his loved ones that a funeral should be planned, as he is on his way to Paradise. Kadish laments for his son.

Scene 3

Atzel's parents, distraught, seek council with Doctor Yoetz. The Doctor asks for eight days to cure Atzel. His plan is to ensure Atzel be careful what he wish for by burying the young man. Both scared and hopeful, the parents agree to the remedy. A funeral is held.

Scene 4

Atzel's room is arranged to look like Paradise. Atzel is delighted by Angels who bring him cakes and ripe fruits. However, he begins to grow restless, desiring to get out of bed and use his body. The Angels remind him that in Paradise one need only relax and enjoy oneself. Atzel finds that this place is also burdened by routine and boredom. Resentful, he wants out of Paradise and wishes he were alive. The Angels declare him unready for their world and announce his return to life.

Scene 5

Atzel is welcomed back to life by his family his fiancé Aksah. He has realized his love for life. A celebration ensues at the wedding of Atzel and Aksah.

Awards
Fool's Paradise received the winning prize in the Vienna Modern composition competition in 1994.

References

External links
Fool's Paradise Official Website

Operas
1994 operas
One-act operas
Operas by Ofer Ben-Amots
Operas based on literature